HMVS Gordon was a torpedo boat operated by the Victorian Naval Forces, the Commonwealth Naval Forces, and the Royal Australian Navy. She was launched in 1884 and lost in an accident in 1914.

Construction
Designed for the defence of the British colony of Victoria, Gordon was ordered on 5 February 1885. She was launched at the Cowes yard of J. Samuel White in 1884.

Gordon was armed with three 1-inch Nordenfelt guns and carried two sets of dropping gear for Whitehead torpedoes. She was manned by 11 men.

Service
Gordon served as a depot tender to Williamstown Dockyard from 1901 to 1914.

When the colonies of Australia were federated in 1901, Gordon became part of the Commonwealth Naval Forces. The Royal Australian Navy was formed in 1911 and from this time she was referred to as HMAS Gordon.

Fate
Gordon was rammed and sunk in Port Phillip Bay by the picket boat Picket on 14 November 1914.

Citations

References
 
Wilson, Michael; Royal Australian Navy 21st Century Warships, Naval auxiliaries 1911 to 1999 including Defence Maritime Services, Profile No. 4 - Revised Edition, Topmill Pty Ltd, Marrickville. 

1884 ships
Torpedo boats of the Victorian Naval Forces
Auxiliary ships of the Royal Australian Navy
Torpedo boats of the Royal Australian Navy
Shipwrecks of Victoria (Australia)
Maritime incidents in November 1914
1914 in Australia